Ledok is a village in the subdistrict Sambong, Blora, Central Java, Indonesia. Its territory is divided into forests, plantations, fields and settlements with an area of approximately 10 km2. It is bordered to the west by Kejalen (Sambong Rejo), the east by Giyanti, to the north by the village Nglebur (kec.jiken) and south by Sambong.

Ledok has abundant natural resources from agriculture, forest, and petroleum. Sugarcane is grown in the area. The forest includes kepoh trees, bamboo forests, teak, and "suplir". 

When it was part of the Dutch East Indies, the area included public baths.

Villages in Central Java